Cowichan knitting is a form of knitting characteristic of the Cowichan people of southeastern Vancouver Island, British Columbia. The distinctively patterned, heavy-knit Cowichan sweaters, popular among British Columbians and tourists, are produced using this method. Cowichan knitting is an  acculturated art form, a combination of European textile techniques and Salish spinning and weaving methods. From this union, new tools, techniques and designs developed over the years.

Cowichan sweaters are also called Siwash sweaters, Indian sweaters, curling sweaters or sometimes Mary Maxim sweaters. While Cowichan is the name of a specific First Nations group, the word Siwash is borrowed from Chinook jargon, the historic trade language of the Pacific Northwest.

History

Pre-contact Cowichan weaving

Before European contact the Coast Salish peoples, including the Cowichan, wove blankets, leggings, and tumplines out of mountain goat wool, dog hair, and other fibres.  The wool was spun with a spindle and whorl, and the blankets were woven on a two-bar loom. There is little information on pre-contact production and use of these weavings, although examples remain in museum collections. No archaeological or ethnographic evidence of knitting or knitting needles exists.

Introduction to European knitting techniques

Sheep were introduced to Vancouver Island in the 1850s, providing a more plentiful source of wool. Around the same time, the first European settlers arrived in the Cowichan Valley. Knitting by native women probably began in a number of ways shortly thereafter. The most organized instruction in knitting was provided by the Sisters of St. Ann, missionaries who came from Victoria to the Cowichan Valley in 1864 to start a school for the Indians. They taught the Cowichan women to knit such items as socks and mitts. The mission has records of students' knitting and other domestic skills being displayed at local fairs and at the Chicago World's Fair in 1893.

After learning how to make socks and mitts, Cowichan women began to knit knee-length underwear and sweaters. Like the other garments, sweaters were and are today knit in the round with no seams, using multiple needles in the European style of the period. The earliest Cowichan sweaters were all of one colour, knitted with a turtle-neck. Some knitters used a raised stitch similar to that of a gansey, possibly inspired by the clothing of the many British fishermen who had settled in the area.

Development of the Cowichan sweater

In time, Cowichan knitters began to embellish sweaters using the Fair Isle technique. The teaching of patterned sweater knitting is generally attributed to a settler from the Shetland Islands, Jerimina Colvin.  Mrs. Colvin settled in Cowichan Station in 1885, raised sheep, and hand-spun and dyed her own wool. She probably began to teach knitting by the 1890s, and added patterns as she learned them from other Scottish settlers.

Another origin theory is that the Sisters of St. Ann, a Roman Catholic institution founded in Quebec to promote the education of rural children, brought knitting to the West Coast. In 1858, four Sisters of St. Ann traveled from Montreal to Victoria to open a schoolhouse for the local children of all different races. Knitting became part of the instruction of Indigenous girls during the 1860s, both at St. Ann's Academy in Victoria and St. Ann's School for Indian Girls in Duncan.

Unlike Fair Isle or Shetland garments, however, Cowichan sweaters are always hand knit of thick, handspun, one-ply natural-coloured yarn in two or three colours (generally cream, black and grey), producing a warm bulky outer garment that is heavier than the multi-coloured Scottish garments made from lightweight two-ply dyed yarn. The classic Cowichan sweater of the 20th century was knitted of white or undyed wool, in coat style, fastened at the front by buttons or a zipper, hip-length, with a shawl collar, and usually ornamented with indigenous or sporting motifs.

Techniques

Wool and its preparation

Because Cowichan knitting developed shortly after the introduction of sheep to Vancouver Island, Cowichan sweaters have always been knitted exclusively from sheep's wool. Down breeds of sheep, such as Dorset, Hampshire and Suffolk, thrive in the coastal climate. Garments produced from the short lofty fleece of these local breeds are characterized by their uneven texture, their warmth and their lightness relative to overall bulk.

The preparation of greasy wool demands several steps, and early procedures have been modified over the years. The oldest wool processing method followed by Cowichan women involved six basic steps: the wool was washed, dried, hand teased, hand carded, drawn out and loosely spun by hand to make a roving, then tightened with a spindle and whorl. Today, many of these steps have been mechanized or eliminated. Some knitters still buy shorn fleeces and go through most of the traditional preparation, but most buy the washed and carded wool directly from a commercial carding mill.

When the wool is obtained from fleeces, knitters remove the suint by leaving them out in the rain to soften and then pulling the wool out. Wool from any source must be washed in warm soapy water, rinsed a number of times, and hung on lines or spread out to dry. Yellowish wool is left in the sun to bleach. Washing is done primarily during the warm summer weather. Knitters hand-tease the dry wool to loosen and separate the matted or tangled fibres by pulling them apart. This allows the dirt, hay and twigs to fall out and makes the wool ready for carding.

Spinning

Cowichan knitters spin wool three different ways: with a Salish spindle and whorl, with a converted sewing machine, and with a home-made spinning machine.  The spindle and whorl are rarely used today.

There are five known types of Salish spindles.  The version used exclusively by the Cowichan people was very large and was used for spinning two ply mountain goat wool and dog hair for weaving.  The spindle was a tapered shaft approximately four feet long.  The whorl, which rested one-half to two-thirds of the way down the shaft, was about eight inches in diameter.  Coast Salish spindle whorls were often highly decorated, and many fine examples can be found in museum collections.

Homemade spinning machines date from the 1890s.  There are two types of Cowichan wheels: each has a foot treadle and pulley, a flyer assembly with a large-sized orifice, a substantial bobbin and flyer, and large, widely spaced guide hooks.

One type of wheel has the wooden flyer assembly mounted horizontally on the table of a treadle sewing machine, and is rotated by means of the foot treadle.  The spinner's left hand draws out the wool to her side, and the right hand guides the twisting yarn into the orifice.  The second wheel is completely homemade.  It also uses a foot treadle, but the spinner faces the spindle orifice instead of the side of the flyer, and feeds the roving in directly.  Today most of the spinning machines have been motorized.  The First Nations-designed spinner heads were copied by manufacturers in the United States, Canada, and New Zealand due to the renewed popularity of crafts in the 1960s.  The specially adapted spinning wheels are now known as Bulky or Indian Head spinners.

Knitting

Learning to knit sweaters and other items was - and remains - a family process. Children often start by helping out with wool processing, and begin to knit mitts and socks around the age of ten. Today, as in the past, most knitting is done by women. Men often play a role by making or repairing the spinners and carders, helping with the washing or carding of the wool, and helping the women sell their works.

Once the preliminary wool preparation steps are completed, knitting can begin.  Early materials for needles included whale bone, deer bone, telephone wire, bamboo chopsticks, and wood.  Today, knitters primarily use readily available and inexpensive plastic or metal needles. No matter which material is used for needles, the sizes vary from 4–7.5mm depending on the weight of the hand spun yarn.

To produce a sweater, the knitter casts on stitches in the usual manner, evenly divided onto at least eight double pointed needles. The number of needles varies according to the size of the sweater, the weight of the yarn, and the length of the needle. There is one extra for the knitting. For sweaters, the knitters always work in the round for a pullover, or back and forth in one piece for a cardigan. After the knitter has divided the stitches on the proper number of needles, she knits a band of ribbing of her chosen design, then increases the number of stitches and continues in stocking or plain stitch. Pockets of the knitter's design are often knit in.

Designs are incorporated in one of two ways.  The simplest is a complete change of colour for a whole row, used most often in the waistband, the cuff, and the collar.  Because there is now a variety of natural-coloured wool for contrasting patterns, contemporary knitters no longer dye their raw material. The larger bands of design are created using the two-colour or Fair Isle knitting technique, in which the unused colour is carried along the back of the work between design units.

Just before reaching the armholes, the knitter may add a few stitches for extra room under the arms. At the armholes, the knitting is divided into an equal number of stitches for the back and the front, and about five stitches from the front and five from the back are put onto a safety pin. The knitter then divides the front in two by putting four stitches from the middle on a safety pin to hold for the collar base. The back is worked straight up from the armholes, and the fronts are worked to the same height with some decreasing at the neck edge for shaping. The shoulders are knit together, and the remaining stitches (usually about one-third) at the neck back are held for the collar.

Each knitter has her own method of making a shawl collar, using garter stitch, basket stitch, or ribbing, and knitting in one colour or incorporating stripes.  A common technique is to pick up two of the four base stitches, start on one side and work up the neck edge to the shoulder by picking up a stitch from the lapel edge on each row and increasing the width of the collar as it is worked. The top ends in line with the shoulder seam. The same is done for the other side. The knitter then picks up stitches from the neck edge and knits back and forth, increasing on each row and picking up stitches form the top of the lapel, then casts off the collar back. Some skilled knitters are able to pick up stitches all around the neckline and knit the collar all at one time by increasing and decreasing for shaping.

To knit the sleeves the knitter picks up the front half of the armhole stitches on the safety pin, picks up stitches around the sleeve front and sleeve back and then adds the back half of the held stitches. Sleeves are knit on three to five needles depending on the size of the garment. The shaping of the sleeve depends on the needle sizes and the designs. Knitters decrease as needed, mostly in the elbow area and cuff, and cast off at the wrist. Knitting down the sleeve, rather than attaching on a separate sleeve, produces a better fitting garment. It also easily enables a sleeve to be lengthened or a cuff repaired. The actual knitting process usually takes two to three days.

Over the years Cowichan knitters have produced a variety of items in addition to their sweaters.  They have responded to market demands by making socks and mitts, and more recently tuques, tams, ponchos, slippers, and baby booties.

Design

Knitters probably began using Fair Isle patterning in the early 1900s (decade), contrasting shades and colours of wool. As they now use only natural colours, the range is limited to whites, greys, browns and blacks, or a combination produced during the carding process. Most knitwear includes only two or three colours. In sweaters, the colours form either geometric or representational designs. Characteristically they are placed horizontally on the mid-portion of the body of the sweater. If the design in this centre portion is geometric, it is laid out in a broad band and repeated on the sleeves. If the main design is representational, it is usually centred on the back, with the same design on the front of a pullover, or two smaller versions of the same representation on either side of the front on a cardigan. There are usually geometric motif bands above and below the representational figure, which are also repeated on the sleeves.

Most knitters collect designs, some of which are passed on through families and friends. Some families have proprietary designs, although this is relatively rare. Designs are incorporated only for their artistic appeal; there is no meaning or implication to them. The popularity of Indian-patterned sweaters prompted the Mary Maxim Company, then headquartered in Sifton, Manitoba, to produce graphed commercial patterns, beginning in the 1940s. Ironically, the knitters soon began to collect and use these charts themselves. They continue to retain favourite designs and to make modifications of them. There are, for example, many variations on the eagle theme. Knitters will also create custom patterns, often with no traditional associations. Despite the diversity of patterns, however, experienced knitters and dealers can often identify the maker of a sweater through the particular qualities of design and knitting style that form a kind of personal signature.

Spread in Popularity
By the 1920s, when interest in the sweaters came from outside the Coast Salish community, both companies and private individuals began to imitate the sweater. One of the more famous imitations came from Mary Maxim, a company that began in the 1940s by Willard S. McPhedrain. At first, Mary Maxim started as a woolen mill, but the business soon expanded after McPhedrian traveled to British Columbia on a sales trip and came across a Cowichan sweater.

Today, companies such as Pendleton Woolen Mills, Ralph Lauren, and Aritzia all have their own version of the Cowichan sweater design. In October 2009, the Hudson's Bay Company (HBC) revealed their clothing line for the 2010 Vancouver Winter Olympics, including the Olympic sweater that looked like a Cowichan design. 

Chief Linda Hwitsum, the chief of the Cowichan Tribes, called for redress from the HBC on October 21, 2009. Because of the sweater's registered trademark, the Cowichan Tribes began seeking legal advice to determine if it will launch legal action against HBC. Meanwhile, individual Cowichan knitters began to plan a silent protest where demonstrators would wear Cowichan sweaters to the torch relays in Victoria, B.C. and Duncan, B.C. that would take place on October 30 and October 31 respectively. Eventually, a compromise was made between the parties; knitters would have an opportunity to sell their sweaters at the downtown Vancouver HBC store, alongside the imitations.

Footnotes

References
Eells, Myron (1976). Myron Eells and the Puget Sound Indians. ed. by Robert H. Ruby and John A. Brown. Seattle: Superior Publishing Co.
Lane, Barbara (1951). "The Cowichan Knitting Industry". Anthropology in British Columbia. Victoria: British Columbia Provincial Museum, Vol. 2, 14–27.
Marr, Carolyn J (1979). A History of Salish Weaving: The Effects of Culture Change on Textile Tradition. Unpublished M.A. Thesis, University of Denver.
Meikle, Margaret (1987). Cowichan Indian Knitting. University of British Columbia Museum of Anthropology Museum Note 21. .
Olsen, Sylvia (2010). Working with Wool: A Coast Salish Legacy and the Cowichan Sweater. Winlaw, BC: Sono Nis Press, 2010.
Canadian Design Resource entry on siwash sweaters.
Mary Maxim Sweater entry on "Wise Hilda Knits" blog.

Canadian fashion
Coast Salish culture
Knitting
Mid Vancouver Island
Sweaters
Knitted garments
Indigenous textile art of the Americas